Brianna Hennessy (born September 23, 1984) is a Canadian paracanoeist. She qualified to represent Canada at the 2021 World Cup in Hungary in Women's KL1, and Women's VL2. 
  
She played wheelchair rugby, for the Tampa Bay Generals. She competed at the 2021 ICF Paracanoe World Cup.

References 

1984 births
Living people
Canadian female canoeists
Place of birth missing (living people)
ICF Canoe Sprint World Championships medalists in paracanoe